Roger J. Skraba (born November 29, 1961) is an American politician serving in the Minnesota House of Representatives since 2023. A member of the Republican Party of Minnesota, Skraba represents District 3A in northern Minnesota, which includes the cities of International Falls and Ely, and parts or all of Cook, Itasca, Koochiching, Lake, and St. Louis Counties.

Early life, education and career 
Born in Ely, Minnesota, Skraba graduated from Ely Memorial High School and attended North Dakota State University, getting his bachelor's degree in construction management.

Skraba served in the United States Army for nine years, attaining the rank of Sergeant. He served on the St. Louis County Board of Adjustment and Planning Commission. Skraba was a member of the Ely City Council and became mayor of Ely in 2021 until his election to the Minnesota House of Representatives in 2023. His listed occupation when elected was business owner.

Minnesota House of Representatives 
Skraba was elected to the Minnesota House of Representatives in 2022, defeating DFL incumbent Rob Ecklund by 15 votes. According to Minnesota state election law, an automatic recount occurred, after which Skraba was declared the winner by 15 votes.

Skraba serves on the Capital Investment, Environment and Natural Resources Finance and Policy, and Legacy Finance Committees.

Electoral history

Personal life 
Skraba lives in Ely, Minnesota. He is Catholic and attends St. Anthony's Catholic Church in Ely.

References

External links

 Roger Skraba For MN House 3A

Members of the Minnesota House of Representatives

1961 births
Living people